Corning Community College is a public community college in Corning, New York.  It was initiated in 1957 and moved to its Spencer Hill campus in 1963. This two-year college serves three counties: Steuben, Chemung, and Schuyler. It is one of the community colleges in the SUNY system.

Campus and programs

The college offers Associate of Sciences, Associate of Arts, Applied Associate of Science, Associate of Occupation Studies and a number of certificates as well.

The college also operates the Eileen M. Collins Observatory.

Notable alumni

 Eileen Collins, ‘76, Retired Colonel, U.S. Air Force, and Commander, NASA
 Stephen D. Daley, ‘68, Senior VP of Media Relations, Porter Novelli
 William "Bill" Hanley, CEO/Chairman of Optical Alchemy, 
 Dr. Richard A. Chordash '67, 2011 Distinguished Alumni Award Recipient:

References

External links

Official website

Education in Steuben County, New York
Educational institutions established in 1957
SUNY community colleges
Two-year colleges in the United States
Corning, New York
Universities and colleges in Steuben County, New York
1957 establishments in New York (state)